Randal Turner is an American operatic baritone.

Early years and training 

Randal Turner was born and raised on a farm near Crawfordsville, Indiana. After studying music and ballet at the Interlochen Arts Academy in Michigan, studied voice at Oberlin and at Indiana University. He also studied at the International Opera Studio in Zürich.

Opera career 
Turner sang the role of Stanley Kowalski in the Italian premiere of A Streetcar Named Desire at the Teatro Regio di Torino in 2003. He has performed in several other European opera houses, including: Opernhaus Zürich, Stadttheater St. Gallen, Landestheater Linz, Vienna Kammeroper, Opéra de Monte-Carlo, Stadttheater Bielefeld, Staatstheater Darmstadt, Opera di Roma, and the Manoel Theatre in Malta.

Turner made his American debut in 2010 as Don Giovanni with Michigan Opera Theater.

Discography 
 Living American Composers  (2011)

References

External links
 Official Website

American operatic baritones
Living people
Singers from Indiana
Year of birth missing (living people)
Classical musicians from Indiana
21st-century American opera singers
21st-century American male singers
21st-century American singers
People from Montgomery County, Indiana
Interlochen Center for the Arts alumni
Oberlin College alumni
Indiana University alumni